Jamie Allen may refer to:

 Jamie Allen (baseball) (born 1958), American former Major League Baseball player
 Jamie Allen (priest) (born 1971), Anglican priest from England
 Jamie Allen (footballer, born January 1995), English football midfielder for Coventry City F.C.
 Jamie Allen (footballer, born May 1995), English football forward

See also 
 James Allen (disambiguation)